Sara Cox (born 1974) is a British television presenter

Sara Cox may also refer to:

Sara M. Cox (1863–1943), American nurse
Sara Cox (rugby union referee) (born 1990/1991), English rugby union referee

See also
Sarah Cox, British civil servant